Pierre Granche (March 14, 1948 – September 30, 1997) was a French-Canadian sculptor. Having studied at the École des Beaux-Arts de Montréal and the Université de Vincennes in Paris, he taught in the art history department of the Université de Montréal for more than twenty years (1975–1997) until his death from lung cancer in Montreal.

As a sculptor, his works are mainly abstract semi-representational pieces, many in aluminium. He was highly influential in the Quebec art world for his method of integrating art and architecture.

Public artworks
Some of his public artworks include:

32 fois passera, le dernier s'envolera, a collection of vertical glass screens with plant forms in aluminum, symbolising education, in the courtyard of the Pavillon J-A-de Sève, UQAM, Montreal;
Lieu re-découvert, an environmental intervention of a variety of truncated pyramid shapes, Le Gardeur hospital, Repentigny, Quebec;
Égalité / équivalence, a grouping of sculptures representing dogs, winged men, and gardens, Université Laval, Quebec City;

See List of Canadians, List of Quebecois.

References

External links
Pierre Granche - Montreal by Metro

1948 births
1997 deaths
Sculptors from Quebec
Contemporary sculptors
20th-century Canadian sculptors
Canadian male sculptors
20th-century Canadian male artists
Deaths from lung cancer
Deaths from cancer in Quebec
Montreal Metro artists
French Quebecers
Academic staff of the Université de Montréal
École des beaux-arts de Montréal alumni